The 1988 United States Senate election in Ohio was held on November 8, 1988. Incumbent Democratic U.S. Senator Howard Metzenbaum won re-election. Metzenbaum easily won the Democratic nomination with over 80% of the vote, while Voinovich was uncontested in his primary. This was the last U.S. senator to win in the Democratic party at this seat until 2006. In addition, Metzenbaum's 56.97% of the vote is to date the best performance for a Democrat running for the U.S. Senate in Ohio, though Sherrod Brown, a Democrat nearly broke that in 2006. Voinovich would later be elected in the other Senate seat ten years later. , this remains the last time that Ohio would support different parties in a concurrent presidential and Senate election.

Major candidates

Democratic 
 Howard Metzenbaum, incumbent U.S. Senator

Republican 
 George Voinovich, Mayor of Cleveland and former Lieutenant Governor of Ohio.

Results

See also 
 1988 United States Senate elections

References 

United States Senate
Ohio
1988